Henrik Wallin (October 9, 1873 – January 28, 1936) was a Savannah, Georgia-based architect.  He was born in Rodviken, Nordmaling, Sweden in 1873.

He designed some works that are included on the National Register of Historic Places within historic districts.

Works include:
Edmund H. Abrahams House, 518 E. Victory Dr. (1922)
Y.M.C.A. Building (1910), Savannah
Wallin Hall (1912, with Edwin Young), at Savannah College of Art & Design
37th Street School (1913)
Armstrong House (c.1917), Savannah
DeRener Apartments (1919), also known as George Ferguson & Lucy Camp Armstrong House, 447 Bull Street
City High School (1920, with others)
First Baptist Church (1922 renovation of 1833 church), 223 Bull Street
Y.M.C.A. Building (1925)
Realty Building (1925)
Charles Willis School (1928, with others)
Florence Street School (1929, with others)
Armstrong Junior College Auditorium (c.1935)
One or more works in Ardsley Park-Chatham Crescent Historic District, Savannah, Georgia
One or more works on Ossabaw Island, 7 mi. S of Savannah, bounded by the Atlantic Ocean, Bear R., Ogeechee R., and St. Catherine's Sound (Wallin, Henrik) 
One or more works in Thomas Square Streetcar Historic District, roughly bounded by Anderson Ln., 42nd St., Victory Dr., E. Broad St., and Martin Luther King Jr. Blvd. Savannah, GA (Wallin, Henrik)

References

American architects
People from Savannah, Georgia
1873 births
1936 deaths